Alt-Schauenburg is a ruined castle in the commune of Frenkendorf, Switzerland.  It is located near the border of France and Germany, and little of the castle remains because of geological events.

History 
Alt-Schauenburg was probably built around 1275 as the seat of a junior branch of the Schauenburg family. The castle was occupied for less than a century. The 1356 Basel earthquake destroyed much of the castle and shortly thereafter the ruins were abandoned. The ruins were gradually buried, until 1949-50 when they were excavated and repaired. In 1976-77 additional construction helped preserve the site.

Origin of the name
Neu-Schauenburg was built before Alt-Schauenburg, but because Alt-Schauenburg was destroyed and abandoned first, it came to be known as the old or alt- castle.

Castle site
Many of the walls are still standing following the two conservation projects.  The southern approach was guarded by a shield wall.  One corner of the wall was protected by a semi-circular avant-corps.  Inside the shield wall, the castle tower and residence hall were rectangular.

See also

 List of castles in Switzerland

References 

Castles in Basel-Landschaft
Liestal
Ruined castles in Switzerland